Rajesh Singh may refer to:

Rajesh Singh (politician) (born 1964), Fijian politician
Rajesh Singh (cricketer, born 1976), Indian cricketer
Rajesh Singh (cricketer, born 1993), Indian cricketer
Rajesh Nandini Singh (1957–2016), Member of the Lok Sabha, the lower house of the Parliament of India (2009–2014)
Rajesh Pratap Singh (born 1969), Indian fashion designer.
Rajesh Singh Adhikari MVC (1970-1999), Indian Army officer who died during the Kargil War

See also
 Rajesh Kumar Singh (disambiguation)